Jess X. Snow (Chinese: 陈雪; born 1992) is a Chinese-Canadian filmmaker, public artist and poet.

Biography

Biography 
Jess X. Snow's parents immigrated from Nanchang, China to Canada after the Cultural Revolution. From 2009 to 2013, Snow attended the Rhode Island School of Design and got a Bachelor of Fine Arts in Film/Animation/Video and Literary Arts. Snow is currently pursuing an MFA in directing at NYU Tisch School of the Arts.

Their film and immersive work has been supported with grants and fellowships from the Tribeca Film Institute, Canada Council of the Arts and commissioned by Adobe, and the Smithsonian Asian Pacific Center. Their murals and political graphics have appeared on walls across the country and on PBS Newshour, The LA Times, during the Women's March on Washington, and in the permanent collection of the Ford Foundation and the Library of Congress. Their children's books titles include The Ocean Calls (forthcoming Kokila/Penguin Randomhouse, written by Tina Cho), and Black Girl Magic (MacmillanUSA, written by Mahogany L. Browne).

They are the director and cinematographer of AFTEREARTH, an immersive 3-channel documentary that won Best Experimental Short Award at the Philly Asian American Film Festival and has screened at a dozen film festivals including Outfest Fusion, CAAMfest, and the LA Asian Pacific Film Festival. Their narrative short, Safe Among Stars is currently in post production.

Art

Murals and installations 
Featured in the LA Times, "We Always Had Wings" is a community mural project in downtown Los Angeles featuring migration of the endangered Yellow-billed cuckoo and portraits of 15 migrant girls at the Miguel Contreras Learning Complex.

"Immigration Is Transformation" was on view at Belonging: Before and After the Immigration Act of 1965 at the Wing Luke Museum of the Asian Pacific American Experience in Seattle's Chinatown until February 2016 (curated by Minh Nguyen). It is created from layers of hand-cut Japanese kozo paper, wire, and fishing line in 2015.

"O Wind, Take Me to My Country" is a mural at the Art Bar Gallery in Kingston, NY on a three-story wall for the 7th Annual O+ Festival. It features a portrait of Safia Elhillo, a Sudanese-Migrant poet.

"Ain't I A Women" is a mural finished in fall 2015 in collaboration with Jetsonorama and features portraits of poets Mahogany Browne and T'ai Freedom Ford with Sojourner Truth's "Ain't I a Woman?" text.

"We Be Darker Than Blue" is a mural installed at the BRIC art space in New York City and portrays two generations of black woman poets: Mahogany Browne and Sonia Sanchez, pioneer of the black arts movement. It is based on the Frida Kahlo painting "The Two Fridas."

Poetry 
Snow performs and tours nationally for their poetry and spoken word, and has received recognition for it. In 2016, Snow's poem "Hunger Drives The Body into Imagination" was nominated for a Pushcart Prize. Her poem "If Cygnus Were A Refugee" was nominated for Best of the Net Anthology.
 "The Last Words of the Honey Bees," Nepantla: Issue II
 "Hunger Drives The Body Into Imagination,"(nominated for a Pushcart Prize), The Blueshift Journal
 "Inheriting The Hurricane" Foundry Journal
 "The Resistance of the Anglerfish," and "The Day I Cracked Open Heaven," The Offing
 "The Field of Cattle" in Wildness
 "If Cygnus Were A Refugee" (nominated for Best of the Net Anthology) "Embroidery", and "First Day of Spring" Storyscape Journal
 "What I Saw Through The Telescope", The Margins
 "How To Forgive 100 Years After A War," Hyphen Magazine

Performances 
 "The Inverse of You Is The Universe," SlamFind 2015
 Ghost Town, 2012

Talks 
Snow has given artist talks and lectures at Vassar College, TEDx CUNY, Netroots Nation, Wellesley College, Willamette University, Pacific Lutheran University, University of Connecticut, Pacific Northwest College of Art on behalf of Artists Against Police Violence, and Institute of American Indian Arts with Demian DinéYazhi. They also participated in multiple panels and conferences:
 Preemptive Education Conference at New York University with Lunar New Year
 open engagement at the Oakland Museum of California with Lunar New Year
 Bushwick Film Festival LGBTQ Panel at BRIC Arts Media House with Tiq Milan and Trae Harris
 Eco-Feminism Conference at Santa Monica College with Tani Ikeda
 Associations of Asian American Studies Conference with Ryan Wong, Victory Matsui and Chad Shomura
 Split This Rock Poetry Conference with Safia Elhillo and Hila Ratzabi
 Ferguson: Past Present and Future at the Rhode Island School of Design with Jonathan Key, on behalf of Artists Against Police Violence
 "Migration: The Radical Imagination," TEDx CUNY 2015
 "On Colony Collapse & Eco-Feminism," Netroots Nation: Ignite Conference 2015
 "Undergraduate Commencement Speech" Rhode Island School of Design, 2013

References

External links
 

Living people
1992 births
21st-century American poets
American women poets
American artists
American women artists
21st-century American women writers